Meropeidae is a family of tiny scorpionflies within the order Mecoptera with only three living species, commonly referred to as "earwigflies" (or sometimes "forcepflies").  These include the North American Merope tuber, the Western Australian Austromerope poultoni, and the recently discovered South American A. brasiliensis. The biology of these species is essentially unknown, and their larvae have never been seen. The disjunct distribution suggests a common origin before the breakup of the ancient supercontinent of Pangaea. There are two undisputed extinct genera, Boreomerope antiqua known from an isolated wing found in the Middle Jurassic Itat Formation of Siberia and Burmomerope with three species from the mid Cretaceous (Cenomanian) aged Burmese amber. As such, the extant members of this family can be considered living fossils. These insects are also of interest due to their presumed basal position in the order Mecoptera. Thaumatomerope with four described species all from the Madygen Formation in Kyrgyzstan has historically sometimes been included within the family,  it was placed into its own monotypic family, "Thaumatomeropidae." in 2002. 

The family name was spelt "Meropidae" in old literature but this clashes with the homonymous family name in birds for bee-eaters. The spelling of Meropeidae was adopted for the insect family by the ICZN in Opinion 140 of 1943.

References

Mecoptera
Insect families
Extant Triassic first appearances